Phrumsengla National Park (Dzongkha: ཕུརམ་སེང་ལ་རྒྱལ་ཡོངས་གླིང་ག), formerly Thrumshingla National Park, in central Bhutan covers just over  across four districts, but primarily in Mongar. It is bisected by the Lateral Road, and contains the Thrumshing La pass.

Flora and fauna

Phrumsengla is home to six species of threatened birds: the rufous-necked hornbill (Aceros nipalensis), rufous-throated wren-babbler (Spelaeornis caudatus), satyr tragopan (Tragopan satyra), beautiful nuthatch (Sitta formosa), Ward's trogon (Harpactes wardi) and Chestnut-breasted partridge (Arborophila mandellii), as well as the near-threatened wedge billed wren babbler (Sphenocichla humei). Phrumsengla has scenic views, including forests ranging with elevations from alpine to sub-tropical. Because the soil of Phrumsengla's biomes is particularly fragile, the land is unsuitable for logging or other development.

Tourism
The Bhutanese Trust Fund identifies excellent tourism potential for Phrumsengla, as it is bisected by Bhutan's highest motorable road, the Lateral Road. Nearly 11,000 people live within the Phrumsengla area demonstrating, in the Trust Fund's opinion, the kingdom's "closest success to a harmonious balance between man and nature." The World Wildlife Fund also maintains operations in the park.

See also
 List of protected areas of Bhutan
 Thrumshing La

References

Eastern Himalayan broadleaf forests
National parks of Bhutan
Protected areas of Bhutan
Protected areas established in 1998
Bumthang District
Lhuntse District
Mongar District
Zhemgang District
1998 establishments in Bhutan
Important Bird Areas of Bhutan